Lawrence G. Miller (April 19, 1936 – June 1, 2014) was an American politician and businessman.

Born in Bridgeport, Connecticut, Miller received his bachelor's degree in business administration from University of Bridgeport. He was President of Milo Oil. He served in the Connecticut House of Representatives from Stratford, Connecticut as a Republican from 1990 until his death.

Notes

1936 births
2014 deaths
Politicians from Bridgeport, Connecticut
University of Bridgeport alumni
Businesspeople from Bridgeport, Connecticut
Republican Party members of the Connecticut House of Representatives
People from Stratford, Connecticut
20th-century American businesspeople